was a Japanese era name (年号, nengō, lit. year name) of the Northern Court during the Era of Northern and Southern Courts after Ōan and before Kōryaku. This period spanned the years from February 1375 through March 1379.

Nanboku-chō overview
   
During the Meiji period, an Imperial decree dated March 3, 1911 established that the legitimate reigning monarchs of this period were the direct descendants of Emperor Go-Daigo through Emperor Go-Murakami, whose  had been established in exile in Yoshino, near Nara.

Until the end of the Edo period, the militarily superior pretender-Emperors supported by the Ashikaga shogunate had been mistakenly incorporated in Imperial chronologies despite the undisputed fact that the Imperial Regalia were not in their possession.

This illegitimate  had been established in Kyoto by Ashikaga Takauji.

Change of era
 1375, also called : The new era name was created to mark an event or series of events. The previous era ended and the new one commenced in Ōan 8.

In this time frame, Tenju (1375–1381) was the Southern Court equivalent nengō.

Events of the Eiwa era
 1375 (Eiwa 1, 3rd month): Shōgun Ashikaga Yoshimitsu visits the Iwashimizu Hachiman-gū where he worships publicly; and he offers a sword for the shrine's treasury, gold foil for the embellishment of the shrine, and racehorses for the shrine's stable.
 1375 (Eiwa 2, 4th month): For the first time, Shōgun Yoshimitsu is permitted to enter the precincts of the Imperial quarters at the Imperial palace in Kyoto.
The objective of this diplomatic mission was to begin negotiating steps to control pirates (wakō).
 1378 (Eiwa 4, 3rd month): Yoshimitsu moves into his new home in Muromachi; and the luxurious house and grounds are called Hana-no-Gosho

Notes

References
 Ackroyd, Joyce. (1982) Lessons from History: The Tokushi Yoron. Brisbane: University of Queensland Press. 
 Kang, Jae-eun and Suzanne Lee. (2006). The Land of Scholars : Two Thousand Years of Korean Confucianism. Paramus, New Jersey: Homa & Sekey Books. ; OCLC 60931394
 Mehl, Margaret. (1997). History and the State in Nineteenth-Century Japan. New York: St Martin's Press. ; OCLC 419870136
 Nussbaum, Louis Frédéric and Käthe Roth. (2005). Japan Encyclopedia. Cambridge: Harvard University Press. ; OCLC 48943301
 Thomas, Julia Adeney. (2001). Reconfiguring Modernity: Concepts of Nature in Japanese Political Ideology. Berkeley: University of California Press. ; 
 Titsingh, Isaac. (1834). Nihon Odai Ichiran; ou,  Annales des empereurs du Japon.  Paris: Royal Asiatic Society, Oriental Translation Fund of Great Britain and Ireland. OCLC 5850691

External links
 National Diet Library, "The Japanese Calendar" -- historical overview plus illustrative images from library's collection

Japanese eras
1370s in Japan